Mercaston is a civil parish in the Derbyshire Dales district of Derbyshire, England.  The parish contains five listed buildings that are recorded in the National Heritage List for England.  All the listed buildings are designated at Grade II, the lowest of the three grades, which is applied to "buildings of national importance and special interest".  The parish, which is almost entirely rural, contains the hamlet of Mercaston and the surrounding countryside.  The listed buildings consist of farmhouses, a farm building and a former mill.


Buildings

References

Citations

Sources

 

Lists of listed buildings in Derbyshire